Affair is the third studio album by American singer Cherrelle.  Released on October 19, 1988, by Tabu Records, It reached #15 on the Top R&B/Hip-Hop Albums chart; and #106 on Billboard Top 200.  It spawned the #1 R&B hit "Everything I Miss at Home," which is Cherrelle's only #1 on that chart to date.  It would also be her last album with long-time producers Jimmy Jam & Terry Lewis.

Background
Cherrelle had recorded two albums previous to this: Fragile (1984) and High Priority (1985).  Both albums had been predominantly produced by Jimmy Jam & Terry Lewis, and this third effort was no different.  After the success of labelmate and frequent duet partner Alexander O'Neal's 1987 concept album Hearsay, it was decided that Cherrelle's latest album would also follow a concept, this time one of a romantic relationship that had soured.  Cherrelle would also have co-writing and co-production input on the album for the tracks: "My Friend," "Crazy (For Loving You)" and "Lucky."

Reception

The soulfully introspective lead single from the album, "Everything I Miss at Home" was very popular and paved the way for the album's success.  The follow-up single was the up-tempo title track "Affair," which peaked at #4 on the Hot R&B/Hip-Hop Songs chart in early 1989.  The album's third and final single "What More Can I Do For You," which had a similar sound to the then upcoming Janet Jackson's Rhythm Nation 1814 would only chart modestly, peaking at #58 on the R&B chart.

"Discreet" had two different intros on some releases.  One intro of the first three seconds is of Cherrelle saying "What song are we doing now, Jimmy Jam?" played backwards.  The other intro segues from "Pick me Up" to a party where Cherrelle and her friend are talking (snippets of the conversation are also heard near the end of the song). The ending is also a few seconds longer on the conversation intro version.

Track listing

Charts

References

1988 albums
Cherrelle albums
Albums produced by Jimmy Jam and Terry Lewis
Tabu Records albums